The 2007–08 Minnesota Golden Gophers men's ice hockey team represented the University of Minnesota in the 2007–08 NCAA Division I men's ice hockey season. The team was coached by Don Lucia and played their home games at Mariucci Arena. This season was the second time during Lucia's tenure where all the players were from the state of Minnesota.

Roster 
As of March 24, 2008.

Junior forward Ryan Stoa suffered a knee injury during the team's October 13, 2007 win over Michigan. He missed the remainder of the season. Sophomore forward Kyle Okposo left the team on December 19, 2007 to sign with the New York Islanders. Senior defenseman Tom Pohl suffered a skull fracture during the team's WCHA first round playoff series with Minnesota State, ending his hockey career.

Season standings 
Note: PTS = Points; GP = Games played; W = Wins; L = Losses; T = Ties; GF = Goals for; GA = Goals against

Regular season

Postseason

WCHA Playoffs

NCAA Playoffs

Season Stats

Scoring Leaders 

Note: GP = Games played; G = Goals; A = Assists; Pts = Points; PIM = Penalty minutes

Goaltending 

Note: GP = Games played; TOI = Time on ice (minutes); W = Wins; L = Losses; GA = Goals against; SO = Shutouts; Sv% = Save percentage; GAA = Goals against average

Awards and records

Awards

WCHA 
 All-WCHA Third Team: Blake Wheeler
 All-Rookie Team: Cade Fairchild

References 

Minnesota
Minnesota Golden Gophers men's ice hockey seasons
Minnesota
2007 in sports in Minnesota
2008 in sports in Minnesota